Judy Dyer (born May 9, 1948) is an American hurdler. She competed in the women's 80 metres hurdles at the 1968 Summer Olympics.

References

External links
 

1948 births
Living people
Athletes (track and field) at the 1968 Summer Olympics
American female hurdlers
Olympic track and field athletes of the United States
Sportspeople from Topeka, Kansas
Track and field athletes from Kansas
21st-century American women
20th-century American women